Sadasiva, is the Supreme Being in the Shaiva Siddhanta tradition of Shaivism. Sadasiva is the omnipotent, subtle, luminous absolute, the highest manifestation of Shiva. Sadasiva blesses with Anugraha and Vilaya, or grace and obscuration of Pasha, which are the fourth and fifth of the Panchakritya, or "five holy acts" of Shiva. Sadasiva is usually depicted having five faces and ten hands, is also considered one of the 25 Maheshwara murtams of Shiva. Shiva Agamas conclude that the Shiva Lingam, especially the Mukhalingam, is another form of Sadasiva.

Representation  
The concept and form of Sadasiva initially emerged from South India, although many ancient sculptures of Sadasiva were obtained from various parts of India and South East Asia. It is believed that the cult of Sadasiva was widespread in the region of Bengal during the period of Sena dynasty who traced their origin in South India. Sadasiva is usually represented in the form of a Mukhalinga with the number of faces varying from one to five. The first ever sculpture of Sadasiva as a lingam with five faces was found in Bhita, near Prayagraj, and dates to the 2nd century CE. His five faces, Ishana, Tatpurusha, Vamadeva, Aghora and Satyojata are known as Panchabrahmas (five creators), the emanations towards the four directions and upwards from the nishkala (formless) Parashiva. Kamiga Agama, the first Agama of 28 Sivagamas depicts Sadasiva as having five faces and ten arms. His five right hands hold Trishula, Axe, Katvanga, Vajra and Abhaya while his five left hands hold Snake, Matulunga fruit, Nilotpala, Damaru, Rudraksha rosary and Varadam. The consort of Sadasiva is goddess Mahagayatri, a form of Parvati often known as Manonmani in Agamic texts. She is sometimes depicted having two arms and residing in the lap of Sadasiva.

Panchabrahma 

According to Shaivite texts, the supreme being Parashivam manifests as pentads, rather than the trinity of other Hindu sects - Brahma, Vishnu and Shiva. His five deeds, known "Panchakrityas" (five holy acts), are assigned to Panchamurti, his five aspects, viz., Brahma, Vishnu, Rudra, Mahesvara and Sadasiva (Mahesvara and Sadashiva are forms of Shiva). Creation, Preservation, Destruction, Obscuration and Grace  are done by these five manifestations respectively. The five faces of Parashiva which emanate these five aspects are praised as "Panchabrahmas", the five creators or the five realities). The Panchamurtis of Shaivism are absorbed within Shaktism and named as "Panchapreta" (five bodies).

Five faces 
The five faces of Sadasiva are sometimes identified with Mahadeva, Parvati, Nandi, Bhairava and Sadasiva himself. The ten arms of Sadasiva represent the ten directions. Given accounts relating to Sadasiva are collected from Kamika Agamam and Vishnudharmottara Purana.

References

Citations

Works cited

External links

Forms of Shiva